Pakin Kuna-anuvit (born 2 June 1998), better known by his nickname Mark, is a Thai former badminton player and actor signed under GMMTV.

Achievements

BWF World Junior Championships 
Boys' doubles

BWF International Challenge/Series 
Men's doubles

Mixed doubles

  BWF International Challenge tournament
  BWF International Series tournament
  BWF Future Series tournament

References

External links 
 

1998 births
Living people
Pakin Kuna-anuvit
Pakin Kuna-anuvit
Pakin Kuna-anuvit
Pakin Kuna-anuvit
Pakin Kuna-anuvit